Hemidactylus sahgali, also known as Sahgal's termite hill gecko, is a species of house gecko from India and Pakistan.

References

Hemidactylus
Reptiles described in 2018
Reptiles of India
Reptiles of Pakistan